Nguyễn Văn Dũng (born 14 April 1994) is a Vietnamese footballer who plays as a left-back for V.League 1 club Hà Nội.

Club career
Văn Dũng joined V.League 1 club Sài Gòn F.C. on loan for the 2016 season.

Honours
Hà Nội
V.League 1: 2016, 2018, 2019, 2022; Runner-up: 2014, 2015, 2020  
Vietnamese National Cup: 2019, 2020; Runner-up: 2015, 2016
Vietnamese Super Cup: 2019, 2020, 2021; Runner-up: 2014, 2016, 2017

External links

References

1994 births
Living people
Vietnamese footballers
Association football fullbacks
V.League 1 players
Hanoi FC players
People from Thái Bình province